A penumbral lunar eclipse took place on Saturday, November 6, 1976, the second of two lunar eclipses in 1976, the first being on May 13. This subtle penumbral eclipse may have been visible to a skilled observer at maximum eclipse. 83.827% of the Moon's disc was partially shaded by the Earth (none of it was in total shadow), which caused a gentle shadow gradient across its disc at maximum; the eclipse as a whole lasted 4 hours, 25 minutes and 52.1 seconds. Occurring only 0.3 days after apogee (Apogee on Saturday, November 6, 1976), the moon's apparent diameter was 6.5% smaller than average.

Saros series 
This is the 9th member of Lunar Saros 145. The previous event was the October 1958 lunar eclipse. The next event is the November 1994 lunar eclipse. Solar Saros 152 interleaves with this lunar saros with an event occurring every 9 years 5 days alternating between each saros series.

Eclipse season 
This event followed the Total solar eclipse of October 23, 1976.

Visibility 
It was visible over Americas, Europe, Africa, Asia and Australia, seen rising over Americas and setting over Asia and Australia.

Related lunar eclipses

Eclipses in 1976 
 An annular solar eclipse on Thursday, 29 April 1976.
 A partial lunar eclipse on Thursday, 13 May 1976.
 A total solar eclipse on Saturday, 23 October 1976.
 A penumbral lunar eclipse on Saturday, 6 November 1976.

Lunar year series

Half-Saros cycle
A lunar eclipse will be preceded and followed by solar eclipses by 9 years and 5.5 days (a half saros). This lunar eclipse is related to two total solar eclipses of Solar Saros 152.

Tzolkinex 
 Preceded: Lunar eclipse of September 25, 1969

 Followed: Lunar eclipse of December 20, 1983

See also 
List of lunar eclipses
List of 20th-century lunar eclipses

Notes

External links 
 

1976-11
1976 in science
November 1976 events